Subhanpur is a village in Punjab, India. It falls under Kapurthala district.

References

Villages in Kapurthala district